Juha Salo (born February 28, 1976) is a Finnish rally driver. He has won the Finnish Rally Championship nine times, in 2002, 2004, 2005, 2008, 2010, 2011, 2013, 2015 and 2016. He is of no relation to Mika Salo.

Complete WRC results

PWRC results

SWRC results

External links
 Official website
 Juha Salo ewrc profile

Living people
1976 births
Finnish rally drivers
World Rally Championship drivers